A train-and-equip program is a military operation in which one country provides training and equipment to an ally. The practice typically involves the transfer of expertise and materiel from a stronger military to a weaker one, as an alternative to fighting together outright. The United States military has run several train-and-equip programs in recent military history.


Bosnia
During the Bosnian War, American president Bill Clinton and Bosnian president Alija Izetbegović agreed to a train-and-equip program for Bosnia, valued at an estimated $500 million USD. American diplomat James W. Pardew oversaw the implementation of the plan. The Bosnian Train and Equip Program was carried out in a multi-agency effort over the course of two years and led to a reduction of military tensions between warring factions in the country and removed foreign extremist influence from the political process. It is widely considered a success in securing the peace in Bosnia and allowing the United States and its NATO partners to responsibly extract themselves from the conflict.

Georgia

From 2002 to 2004, the American military spent  training the Georgian Armed Forces for service in the Global War on Terror. The British Army also helped train and equip Georgian forces. Georgia would go on to fight with the coalition forces in the Iraq War.  The goal of the program was to boost the proficiency of Georgia's security forces in the areas of border security, anti-terrorism, disaster response, etc.

Syria

The Syrian Train and Equip Program is an ongoing  initiative to support moderate rebels and anti-extremist elements in the Syrian Civil War. The program's training takes place in numerous neighboring countries such as Turkey, Jordan, and Qatar and has led to the creation of groups such as the New Syrian Army and Division 30.

See also
Lend-Lease
Vietnamization

References

Military education and training
Military equipment
Military logistics